Seo Su-yeon (born January 8, 1986) is a South Korean para table tennis player. She won a silver medal and a bronze at the 2016 Summer Paralympics. She also won two silver medals at the 2020 Summer Paralympics held in Tokyo, Japan. She is coached by Cho Jae-kwan.

When she was 18, Seo aspired to be a model and visited a hospital to correct her posture. Instead, she was paralysed by an injection. She began playing table tennis while she fought the hospital in courts.

References

1986 births
Sportspeople from South Jeolla Province
South Korean female table tennis players
Table tennis players at the 2016 Summer Paralympics
Table tennis players at the 2020 Summer Paralympics
Medalists at the 2016 Summer Paralympics
Medalists at the 2020 Summer Paralympics
Living people
People with paraplegia
Paralympic silver medalists for South Korea
Paralympic bronze medalists for South Korea
Paralympic medalists in table tennis
Paralympic table tennis players of South Korea
People from Mokpo
21st-century South Korean women